Jean Van Cant (6 June 1891-20 March 1926) was a Belgian international footballer.

Career
Van Cant played for Racing Club Mechelen. He scored 7 goals in 10 appearances for the Belgian national side, including a hat-trick against Germany in 1913.

References

1891 births
Belgian footballers
Belgium international footballers
Year of death missing
Association football forwards